The 1896 Alabama gubernatorial election took place on August 3, 1896, in order to elect the governor of Alabama. Incumbent Democrat William C. Oates decided not to run for a second term in office.

Results

References

1896
gubernatorial
Alabama
August 1896 events